William Rea Store is a historic commercial building located in the Murfreesboro Historic District at Murfreesboro, Hertford County, North Carolina.  It was built about 1790, and is a two-story, three bay, brick building with a one-story, three bay wing.  It is one of the oldest commercial buildings in North Carolina.  It was built by William Rea, a wealthy Boston merchant.

It was listed on the National Register of Historic Places in 1970.

The building is owned by the Murfreesboro Historical Association and serves as its main museum site, the William Rea Museum. Exhibits include area agriculture, education, architecture, river trade, Native American life, and the lives of inventors Richard Jordan Gatling and his brother James Henry Gatling. The Association also operates the Brady C. Jefcoat Museum, tours of Dr. Walter Reed House, John Wheeler House, shops and the Agriculture and Transportation Museum. The Association's office is located in the Roberts-Vaughan House.

References

External links
 Murfreesboro Historical Association

Historic American Buildings Survey in North Carolina
Commercial buildings on the National Register of Historic Places in North Carolina
Commercial buildings completed in 1790
Buildings and structures in Murfreesboro, North Carolina
National Register of Historic Places in Hertford County, North Carolina
1790 establishments in North Carolina
Historic district contributing properties in North Carolina
Museums in Hertford County, North Carolina